The 2005–06 CERS Cup was the 26th season of the CERS Cup, Europe's second club roller hockey competition organized by CERH. 18 teams from seven national associations qualified for the competition as a result of their respective national league placing in the previous season. Following a preliminary phase and four knockout rounds, Barcelona won its first title.

Preliminary phase 

|}

Knockout stage

See also
2005–06 CERH European League

References

External links
 CERH website
 RinkHockey.net

World Skate Europe Cup
CERS Cup
CERS Cup